QM may refer to:

Businesses and organizations
 QM Productions, a TV production company founded by Quinn Martin
 Air Malawi (IATA airline designator QM)
 Queen Margaret Union, a students' union at the University of Glasgow
 Queen Mary University of London, a public research university
 Queen Mary's Grammar School, a selective boys secondary school in Walsall
 Queen Mary Hospital (Hong Kong), Pokfulam, Hong Kong Island
 Queensland Museum, Australia

Science, technology, and mathematics

Computing
 OpenQM, referred to as 'QM', a commercial multi-value database system
 Quine-McCluskey algorithm, for minimizing two-level logic

Other uses in science, technology, and mathematics
 Quadratic mean, in mathematics
 Quantum mechanics, in physics
 Quantitative methods, or quantitative research
 ATCvet code QM Musculo-skeletal system, a section of the Anatomical Therapeutic Chemical Classification System for veterinary medicinal products

Other uses
 Qualified Mortgage, in finance
 Quality management, in business
 Quartermaster, a military or naval role, often related to supply and provisioning
 , a Cunard ocean liner
 Quizmania, an ITV British television quiz game show